"Avalon" is a song by Swiss rock band Lovebugs. The song features Norwegian singer Lene Marlin but Lovebugs also recorded and played the song themselves. "Avalon" is included on the 2006 album, In Every Waking Moment. The song was released as single, placing number 10 in Switzerland and number 13 in Norway.

External links
Lovebugs, featuring Lene Marlin - Avalon

Swiss pop songs
2006 singles
English-language Swiss songs
Lene Marlin songs